Henrys Lake State Park is a public recreation area located on the south shore on Henrys Lake  north of Island Park in Fremont County, Idaho, U.S. The state park occupies  off US 20 near Goose Bay and the Henrys Lake Outlet. Park facilities include hiking trails, boat ramp, campgrounds, and cabins. It is home to cutthroat trout, cutbow, moose, pronghorn, swans, pelicans, various waterfowl and sandhill cranes.

See also
 List of Idaho state parks
 National Parks in Idaho

References

External links

Henrys Lake State Park Idaho Parks and Recreation
Henrys Lake State Park Map Idaho Parks and Recreation

State parks of Idaho
Protected areas of Fremont County, Idaho
Protected areas established in 1973